Neutron Holdings, Inc., doing business under the name Lime, formerly LimeBike, is a transportation company based in San Francisco, California. It runs electric scooters, electric bikes and electric mopeds in various cities around the world. The system offers dockless vehicles that users find and unlock via a smartphone app that knows the location of available vehicles via GPS.

History
LimeBike was founded in January 2017 by Brad Bao and Toby Sun, both of whom were executives of Fosun International's venture capital arm. It raised US$12 million in venture funding led by Andreessen Horowitz in March 2017. The company's first location, University of North Carolina at Greensboro, launched in June 2017 with 125 bicycles.

LimeBike expanded in July 2017 to the cities of Key Biscayne, Florida, South Bend, Indiana, and South Lake Tahoe, California. On July 27, 2017, LimeBike launched with 500 bicycles in Seattle, Washington, becoming the city's second bikeshare operator.

The company closed a Series B round of venture funding in October 2017, announcing that it was valued at $225 million. A $335 million funding round in 2018 led to a valuation of $1.1 billion for the company, making it a unicorn.

, Lime had 150,000 users.

In January 2018, Lime announced at CES 2018 that they would begin a trial of electric bikes, branded Lime-E, in San Francisco. The following month Lime-S electric scooters were announced. There was criticism in April 2018 when Lime left several hundred scooters on the streets of US cities without the permission of municipal authorities. Public criticism increased in June when it emerged that the scooters were programmed to play a recording of the message "Unlock me to ride me, or I'll call the police" repeatedly, at high volume, when their controls were touched.

In May 2018, the company announced plans to begin development of transit pods, small self-driving electric vehicles. Lime applied for car-sharing permits in Seattle in October 2018 and later launched a service in December 2018 with a fleet of Fiat 500 Lounge cars branded as "LimePod."

In August 2018, the company signed a deal with Uber to provide them with electric bikes for the expansion of their Uber Bikes service.

In September 2018, a 24-year-old man in Dallas, Texas in United States died in a single vehicle Lime scooter accident. The responding police officer found a Lime electric scooter broken in half about 500 feet from where the victim was found unresponsive.

In October 2018 Lime announced the release of a new model e-scooter with larger wheels, built-in suspension and an aluminum frame to combat vandalism and extend vehicle life.

In May 2019, co-founder and chief executive officer Toby Sun stepped down reportedly to focus on R&D while Brad Bao, a Lime co-founder, took his place as CEO.

In September 2019, Lime was recognized as one of the LinkedIn's Top Startups for 2019. This was the first time Lime has been listed, and it was ranked at No. 12 amongst the list of 50 startups.

In January 2020, Lime laid off about 100 employees, approximately 14 percent of its workforce, and ended its scooter rental service in a dozen markets, including Atlanta, Phoenix, San Diego and San Antonio. Further layoffs in April were attributed to the COVID-19 pandemic, with the CEO saying, "We had to pause operations in 99% of our markets worldwide to support cities’ efforts at social distancing."

Starting in March 2020, due to reduced demand for electric scooters during the COVID-19 lockdown in 2020, Lime suspended services in nearly two dozen countries.

In April 2020, Lime is reported to have acquired assets of electric skateboard startup Boosted.

Lime acquired the Jump e-bike and scooter business from Uber in May 2020, along with a $170 million funding round led by Uber, with Bain Capital Ventures and GV participating. The deal valued Lime at $510 million, down 79% from its $2.4 billion valuation in April 2019. At the same time, Brad Bao stepped down as CEO, replaced by Wayne Ting.

In November 2020, Lime reported the first profitable quarter and predicted 2021 full-year profitability.

In April 2021, Lime is listed as one of the 2021 Time100 Most Influential Companies by Time Magazine.

In November 2021, Lime closed an oversubscribed funding round raising $523 million and announced an intention to take the company public in 2022. The company also announced in 2021 that riders had surpassed 250 million rides using Lime services, making it the largest shared micromobility operator globally in terms of total trips.

Usage 

The user installs the Lime app on a device (typically a smartphone), on which are displayed all the vehicles available (tracked by GPS) nearby. Before starting a trip, the user supplies payment information. The user then scans the QR code on the vehicle, beginning the trip. To end the trip, the user parks the vehicle then ends the ride through the app. The price of the trip is immediately withdrawn from the user's payment method, unless using a pre-loaded Ride Pass. Lime requires users to take a picture of the parked vehicle and its surroundings to review whether the vehicle was parked improperly. If any problems were encountered with the trip (like a malfunctioning vehicle) the user can report it through the app.

Locations 
As of March 2022, Lime operated in more than 150 cities across more than 30 countries.

As part of trials approved by the UK Department for Transport, Lime began operating e-scooters in the UK—where the use of e-scooters outside of trials remains illegal in public—from mid-2020. Lime trial areas in the UK currently include Greater Manchester and Milton Keynes. A trial in London, operated by Dott, Lime and TIER Mobility commenced in June 2021.

Vehicles 
Lime, depending on location, uses three different types of vehicles.

Lime-S 
Four different electric scooter models are currently in use:
 Lime-S Ninebot ES4, made by Segway with extra battery attached on to the Main Pole.
 Lime-S Generation 2
 Lime-S Generation 3, designed in-house by Lime.
Lime-S Generation 4, designed in-house by Lime.

Vehicle malfunctions 
Some of Lime's electric scooters have been recalled due to mechanical failures. In October 2018, Lime recalled a number of its Segway Ninebot scooters after cases of batteries "smoldering, or in some cases, catching fire".

In November 2018, Lime issued a recall of its Okai-model scooters on reports that the baseboards could "break in half". The recall was issued following internal comments by employees that its scooters were unsafe for public use.

In February 2019, Lime issued a safety update, announcing that some of its scooters could malfunction and their wheels could "lock up". The company was forced to temporarily withdraw its scooters from circulation in Auckland and Dunedin, New Zealand, after injuries caused by irregular braking incidents. According to Consumer Reports, affected Lime scooters had buggy faulty firmware.

User collaborations 
In some locations, Lime scooters are charged by private contractors who sign up to become "Juicers". The company sends approved Juicers charging equipment, and pays them to charge scooters overnight then place them at designated "LimeHubs" throughout the company's service area in the morning. Juicing can become competitive, with Juicers in some markets using vans and other creative means to pick up scooters all over a city.

Lime also operates some cities exclusively with its own staff.

Conflicts with local  authorities

Fort Lauderdale, USA
In February 2019, a Fort Lauderdale Lime user was placed in a vegetative state after a violent collision with a car while riding a Lime scooter on the road, not the legally permitted sidewalk use.  The injured woman was allegedly instructed to use the road by Lime's app.

Australia 
In June 2020, the Australian Competition & Consumer Commission found that Lime covered up at least 50 incidents on its scooters that resulted in injuries such as broken bones and damaged teeth.

San Francisco, USA
In September 2018, Lime sued San Francisco for denying Lime a permit. Lime had been operating in San Francisco without permission and received a cease-and-desist letter.

Milwaukee, USA
Scooters were initially banned in Milwaukee when Bird Rides Inc. started their scooter business without permission. Wisconsin's Governor Tony Evers signed a bill July 11, 2019 regulating scooters. Shortly after the Governor's decision, Lime began operating in Milwaukee in a pilot program, until the city again halted scooter rentals because of complaints about riders riding on sidewalks. Lime wanted to increase its fleet of 500 scooters in the Milwaukee area but were denied permission.

Cease-and-desist letters
Lime has received cease-and-desist letters from numerous cities across the US, including Reno and Indianapolis.

References

External links

 

Bicycle sharing companies
Scooter sharing companies
American companies established in 2017
Transport companies established in 2017
2017 establishments in California
Companies based in San Mateo, California
Uber